Ernst Heinrich August de la Motte Fouqué (4 February 1698 – 3 May 1774) was a Prussian Lieutenant general and General der Infanterie and a confidant of King Frederick the Great. Fouqué held the title of Freiherr (baron).

Early life
Born in The Hague to an old Norman family, Fouqué was the second son of a Huguenot nobleman who had emigrated from France as a result of the revocation of the Edict of Nantes. In 1706, Fouqué became a page at the court of Leopold I, Prince of Anhalt-Dessau. As a cadet in the 3rd Infantry Regiment of Halle, Fouqué took part in the Prussian campaign in Vorpommern. He was promoted to Premier-Leutnant on 8 March 1719, to Stabskapitän in 1723, and on 21 February 1729 to company commander.

Friendship with Frederick the Great
Fouqué befriended Crown Prince Frederick of Prussia, visiting him while the crown prince restricted to Küstrin. Fouqué was a common guest of Frederick's at Rheinsberg. Frederick nicknamed his friend 'Chastity', and Fouqué was allegedly one of the best actors at the Prussian court. Amongst his closest friends, Frederick formed the "Bayard Order" to study warfare. Fouqué was the grand master of the gatherings, at which archaic French was used.

Prussian military career
After a dispute with Leopold over his lack of promotion, Fouqué left Prussia to enter Danish service. When Frederick acceded to the throne in 1740, he induced Fouqué's return by promoting him to Oberst on 26 July, making him commander of the newly created Füsilier-Regiments Nr. 37, and awarding him the Order of the Black Eagle.

In 1742 during the First Silesian War, Fouqué led a grenadier battalion and was named Governor of Glatz. The Calvinist dealt ruthlessly with Austrian irregulars in the Catholic County of Glatz, hanging many of them. Promoted to Generalmajor on 13 May 1743, he was named commander of the Infanterie-Regiment Nr. 33 a year later. He guarded Friedrich von der Trenck at the prison of Glatz until the adventurer escaped in 1746. Frederick the Great promoted Fouqué to Generalleutnant on 22 January 1751.

In 1757 during the Seven Years' War, Fouqué hanged the Catholic priest Andreas Faulhaber for allegedly inciting Glatz's garrison to desert. Frederick entrusted Fouqué with 13,000 troops in order to guard Silesia against enemy attacks. In June 1760, the outnumbered Fouqué was forced to withdraw from combat by an Austrian force three times as large led by Ernst Gideon von Laudon. When Frederick ordered the general to advance again, 8,000 troops under Fouqué were defeated in the resulting Battle of Landeshut on 23 July. Wounded thrice by sabres, Fouqué would have died if not for his hostler, Trautschke, who alerted the Austrian dragoons they were attacking a commanding officer. When the dragoon leader Colonel Voit protected Fouqué and offered him his horse, Fouqué replied, "I might soil the fine saddle with my blood," to which Voit responded, "My saddle can only gain from being stained by the blood of a hero." When Frederick heard about Fouqué's capture and behavior, he stated, "Fouqué behaved like a Roman."

Retirement
Fouqué was released from Austrian captivity in 1763 when the war ended. Needing to use a wheelchair and believing himself dishonored by the defeat at Landeshut, Fouqué refused Frederick's offer to return to Glatz and instead retired to Brandenburg an der Havel. The king in Potsdam and the general in Brandenburg frequently corresponded with each other through gifts of food and drink. After Fouqué died in Brandenburg, his biography was written by his grandson, Friedrich de la Motte Fouqué.

Notes

References

Further reading
 Joachim Engelmann and Günter Dorn: Friedrich der Große und seine Generale, Friedberg 1988. 
 Großer Generalstab - Kriegsgeschichtliche Abteilung II (Hrsg.): Die Kriege Friedrichs des Großen - Dritter Teil: Der Siebenjährige Krieg 1756-1763 - Zwölfter Band: Landshut und Liegnitz, Berlin 1913, S. 277-278. 

1698 births
1774 deaths
Barons of Germany
Prussian military personnel of the Seven Years' War
Military personnel from The Hague
Generals of Infantry (Prussia)
Royal favourites
People of the Silesian Wars